Ganga is a 2006 Indian Bhojpuri-language film directed by Abhishek Chhadha and produced by Deepak Sawant. Nagma has won Bhojpuri Film Award for Best Actress at Second Bhojpuri Film Awards in 2007.

Cast 
 Amitabh Bachchan as Thakur Vijay Singh 
 Hema Malini as Thakurain Savitri V. Singh 
 Nagma as Ganga 
 Ravi Kishan as Shankar 
 Ajai Sharma as Ranjit V. Singh 
 Manoj Tiwari as Bajrangi

See also 
 Bhojpuri cinema
 List of Bhojpuri films

References

External links

2006 films
2000s Bhojpuri-language films